German submarine U-481 was a Type VIIC U-boat of Nazi Germany's Kriegsmarine during World War II. The submarine was laid down on 6 February 1943 at the Deutsche Werke yard in Kiel, launched on 25 September 1943, and commissioned on 10 November 1943 under the command of Oberleutnant zur See Ewald Pick.

Design
German Type VIIC submarines were preceded by the shorter Type VIIB submarines. U-481 had a displacement of  when at the surface and  while submerged. She had two shafts and two  propellers.

U-481 was fitted with five  torpedo tubes (four fitted at the bow and one at the stern), fourteen torpedoes, one  SK C/35 naval gun, (220 rounds), one  Flak M42 and two twin  C/30 anti-aircraft guns. The boat had a complement of between forty-four and sixty.

Service history

First patrol
U-481 left Kiel on 19 June 1944 under the command of Kapitänleutnant Klaus Andersen, and sailed to Reval (now Tallinn, Estonia) via Helsinki. She departed Reval on her first war patrol on 5 July and sailed east into the Gulf of Finland to Soviet waters. On 30 July she attacked a group of Soviet Navy coastal minesweepers with torpedoes, sinking two (KT-804 and KT-807) and damaging another (KT-806). On the same day the U-boat was attacked while in Narva Bay by two Ilyushin Il-2 Shturmovik aircraft from the 35th Assault Air Regiment (35. ShAP), and managed to damage one enough to force the pilot to ditch his aircraft. The U-boat arrived back at Reval on 4 August.

Second patrol
U-481 sailed again from Reval on 10 August 1944, and patrolled Soviet waters with no success, before arriving at Königsberg in East Prussia, on 21 August.

Third patrol
Departing Königsberg on 16 September 1944, the U-boat patrolled the Baltic, and on 15 October sank three small Finnish Galeas sailing barges (Dan, Endla and Maria) off Osmussaar, Estonia, with shell-fire, before arriving at Danzig (now Gdansk) on 26 October.

Fourth patrol
U-481 sailed from Danzig on 2 November 1944, returning to the Gulf of Finland, and on 9 November off Cape Pakri she torpedoed and shelled the Soviet 1,000 GRT barge 112600, sinking her. On 28 November she sank the Soviet 108 tons coastal minesweeper T-387 in the same area. The U-boat returned to Danzig on 22 December.

Fifth patrol
After returning to Kiel to be fitted with a 'schnorchel' in February 1945, the U-boat sailed for Horten Naval Base in Norway, making her final patrol along the Norwegian coast from 7 April to 4 May, finally arriving at Narvik only a few days before the German surrender. On 12 May all U-boats in the Narvik area were ordered by the Allies to sail to Skjomenfjord to avoid conflicts with the Norwegians. On 15 May four ships; the fleet tender Grille with the staff of FdU Norwegen on board, the fleet oiler Kärnten, and the depot ships Huascaran and Stella Polaris, and fifteen U-boats including U-481, sailed for Trondheim, but were intercepted after two days by the Royal Navy's 9th Escort Group and officially capitulated. The ships were allowed to proceed to Trondheim, but all the U-boats were escorted to Loch Eriboll, Scotland, arriving on 19 May.

Summary of raiding history

References

Notes

Citations

Bibliography

 U-Boat Fact File, Midland Publishing, Great Britain: 1998.

External links

German Type VIIC submarines
U-boats commissioned in 1943
U-boats sunk in 1945
World War II submarines of Germany
Operation Deadlight
1943 ships
Ships built in Kiel
Maritime incidents in November 1945